Peter Benson Walker (8 May 1922 – 14 July 1987) was an Australian politician.

He was born in Hobart. In 1982 he was elected to the Tasmanian House of Assembly as a Liberal member for Denison, but he was defeated in 1986. He died the following year.

References

1922 births
1987 deaths
Liberal Party of Australia members of the Parliament of Tasmania
Members of the Tasmanian House of Assembly
20th-century Australian politicians